Terekhovo is a station on the Bolshaya Koltsevaya line of the Moscow Metro. It was opened on 7 December 2021 as part of the section between Mnyovniki and Kakhovskaya.

Name

References

Moscow Metro stations
Railway stations in Russia opened in 2021
Bolshaya Koltsevaya line
Railway stations located underground in Russia